NDTV Indian of the Year is the annual award given by the NDTV group.

Winners of the Award

Seventh NDTV Indian of the Year
The Seventh NDTV Indian of the Year was held at the Taj Palace Hotel on 18 October 2011. The winners were:
 Indian of the Year – Anna Hazare and Arvind Kejriwal
 India's Heroes – India national cricket team
 Entertainer of the Year (Movie) – Zindagi Na Milegi Dobara
 Entertainer of the Year (Music) – Shankar–Ehsaan–Loy
 Lifetime Achievement Award – Dev Anand and Rahul Dravid
 LIC Unsung Hero of the Year – RTI activists Amit Jethwa, Dattatreya Patil, Vishram Dodiya, Satish Shetty and Vitthal Gite
 Transformational Idea of the Year Award – Nandan Nilekani
 Icon of India – N. R. Narayana Murthy

Eighth NDTV Indian of the Year
The Eighth NDTV Indian of the Year was held on 15 April 2013 dedicated to the Daughters of India and celebrating the 25th Silver Jubilee of the news channel. The winners were: 
 Daughter of India – Nirbhaya
 Justice for the Indian Woman – Justice J. S. Verma Committee
 Entertainer of the Year – Sridevi
 Entertainer of the Decade – Kareena Kapoor
 Lifetime Achievement Award – Yash Chopra and Pandit Ravi Shankar and Prathap C. Reddy
 LIC Unsung Hero of the Year – Rajni Sekhri Sibal
 Sportspersons the Year Award – Gagan Narang and Yogeshwar Dutt
 Achievement in Health – Apollo Group

Ninth NDTV Indian of the Year
The Ninth NDTV Indian of the Year Award Ceremony was held on 29 April 2014.
Lifetime Achievement Award - Amjad Ali Khan and Satish Gujral
Business leader of the year - Rajiv Bajaj
Sportsperson of the year - P. V. Sindhu
Actor of the year- Kangana Ranaut
Bollywood youth icon of the year - Ranbir Kapoor
Entertainer of the year - Deepika Padukone

The other winners include T. Raja of New Ark Mission of India.

See also
CNN-IBN Indian of the year

References

Indian awards
Awards established in 2005
NDTV Group
2005 establishments in Delhi